Pinjar is a rural locality in Perth, Western Australia. Its local government area is the City of Wanneroo.

History
The suburb of Pinjar is named after the large swampy lake of this name located north east of Wanneroo. The lake name is shown on government plans from 1868, and the name is of Noongar origin. The meaning of Pinjar is unknown, but could be "tadpole" or "swampy lake".

Geography
Pinjar is bounded by Pinjar Road/Old Yanchep Road to the west and Neaves Road to the south. Its northern and eastern boundaries are not gazetted.

Facilities
Pinjar is a sparsely populated agricultural suburb, most of which is pine plantation and wetland. At the 2006 Australian census, Pinjar had a population of 78 people living in 39 dwellings. It was not measured in 2011.

Motorsport
Pinjar is home to the Wanneroo Raceway, a 2.411 km (1.498 mi) road racing circuit. The raceway which opened in 1969, is the home of motor racing in Western Australia and hosts an annual round of the V8 Supercars championship.

Pinjar is also home to the Pinjar Park Speedway, which opened in 2005. Pinjar Park is a  motorcycle speedway, and regularly hosts national and international meetings and caters to both senior and junior solo and sidecar racing. For the bikes, the speedway replaced the old  Claremont Speedway, which had run from 1927 until 2000, and the Bibra Lake Speedway which closed in 2004.

References

Suburbs of Perth, Western Australia
Suburbs of the City of Wanneroo